Leila Shenna (born Morocco) is a Moroccan former actress who featured on film mostly in the 1970s.

She is most commonly remembered in English speaking countries for her role as a Bond girl in the 1979 film Moonraker as an evil air hostess. However, she also starred in the 1968 film Remparts d'argile (initially released in Italy, later released in the United States in 1970 under the title Ramparts of Clay) directed by Jean-Louis Bertucelli, the 1975 Palme D'or winner Chronique des années de braise directed by Mohammed Lakhdar-Hamina, as well as the 1982 Algerian film Vent de sable, also directed by Lakhdar-Hamina. The first two films were set in Algeria, the third simply in the desert. She also had a minor role in the 1977 film March or Die.

She is the cousin of Malika Oufkir, the writer of Stolen Lives: Twenty Years In A Desert Jail, an account of the failed 1972 assassination attempt on the King of Morocco by her father (and Leila's uncle), General Mohamed Oufkir.

Filmography
Win to Live (1968)
Ramparts of Clay (1970) – Rima
Sex-Power (1970) – La sirène
Décembre (1973)
Chronicle of the Years of Fire (1975) – La femme
El Chergui (1975)
Château Espérance (1976, TV Series) – Leila
March or Die (1977) – Arab Street Girl
Désiré Lafarge (1977, TV Series)
Moonraker (1979) – Hostess Private Jet
Sandstorm (1982) – (final film role)

References

External links
 

Year of birth missing (living people)
Living people
Moroccan film actresses
20th-century Moroccan actresses